James Michael O'Sullivan (5 February 1883 – 21 December 1960) was a New Zealand rugby union player. A loose forward, O'Sullivan represented  at a provincial level, and was a member of the New Zealand national side, the All Blacks, from 1905 to 1907. He played 29 matches for the All Blacks five of which were internationals, including the famous "Match of the Century" against Wales. He later served as president of the Taranaki Rugby Union.

O'Sullivan died in Hāwera on 21 December 1960, and was buried at Hāwera Cemetery.

References

1883 births
1960 deaths
Burials at Hawera Cemetery
New Zealand international rugby union players
New Zealand rugby union players
New Zealand sports executives and administrators
Rugby union flankers
Rugby union players from Taranaki
Taranaki rugby union players